Richard Rockley Dibden (born 29 January 1975), is a former professional cricketer, who spent four years with Hampshire County Cricket Club. 

He was born in Southampton, Hampshire, England, and educated at The Mountbatten School And Language College, and at Loughborough University. He now works for C.M.A. Financial Recruitment.

External links
Profile of Richard Dibden
Richard Dibden`s statistics at Cricinfo

1975 births
Hampshire cricketers
English cricketers
Alumni of Loughborough University
Living people
Hampshire Cricket Board cricketers
British Universities cricketers